Douglas R. Momary (born June 1, 1947) is an American writer, actor, producer, and composer for television and film.  Most notably, he was the co-writer and co-creator of the 1970s children's TV show New Zoo Revue, in which he also starred, alongside his wife Emily Peden.

Momary and Peden own and operate the Nevada-based company Laguna Productions, which produces educational and industrial shorts, PSAs, and television commercials.

References

External links

1947 births
Living people
Actors from Paterson, New Jersey
American male television actors
American television writers
American male television writers
Male actors from New Jersey
Screenwriters from New Jersey
Television producers from New Jersey